Newport is a coastal suburb in the Moreton Bay Region, Queensland, Australia.

Geography

History

An earlier, unsuccessful attempt by the council to create the suburb was made in the 1990s.

Until 2008, Newport was made up of two areas - with that east of Albatross & Walkers Creek Canal being Scarborough, and that on the western side being part of Kippa-Ring. Currently, new land is being cleared and canals being dug out to form the next stage of the suburb to the west of the current established area.

The name Newport comes from the Newport Waterways housing estate that began development in the late 1970s; the artificial canals first filled with water in 1979.

In 1985 the residents of Newport formed the Newport Waterways Property Owners Association Inc (NWPOA) to work with the Moreton Bay Regional Council (previously Redcliffe City Council) and Marina developers to maintain the canals and marine environment in a pristine condition. In 1986 following a number of burglaries, the NWPOA established a Neighbour-hood Watch program called "Newport Watch" to improve community security and social services to canal residents

The first stage of the Newport Waterways housing estate included reclaiming land where Endeavour Park is now situated and the clearance of swampy marshland behind Sunnyside Road. The suburbs first two estates which included the areas north and south of Griffith Road were completed by the early 1990s.

In the mid-late 1990s new canals were constructed west of the area formerly known as Kippa-Ring and a bridge over Albatross Canal, the main waterway, was finished in 2000. A small section of land was sold off as the first stage of the "Isles Of Newport" estate in the early 2000s west of Boardman Road in Kippa-Ring and featured a large park for residents.

With the announcement of the Redcliffe Peninsula railway line some 1.5 km from the centre of Newport and rapid growth projected for the Moreton Bay Region, Redcliffe Seaside Estates Pty Ltd, the developer of the entire Newport suburb, sold their remaining 143ha of land to Stockland in late 2014. The acquisition of land will see Newport's final stages completed within a decade and will include a retail precinct, large non-tidal lake and hundreds of house lots of various sizes. The purchase is Stockland's first major land acquisition in Queensland since North Lakes.

Newport is home to Spinnaker Park, which was voted Australia's Favourite Playground in 2021.

Economy
Newport is known for its predominantly water-side residential housing with artificial canal waterways, near the thriving seafood industry at the Scarborough Boat Harbour.

Education 
Southern Cross Catholic College is located in Scarborough. 
Government primary schools are Scarborough State School in neighbouring Scarborough to the north-east and Hercules Road State School in neighbouring Kippa-Ring to the south. The nearest government secondary school is Redcliffe State High School in neighbouring Redcliffe in south-east.

Amenities 
The NWPOA continues to provide community services such as regular newsletters "The Newport News", Santa on the canals at Christmas, Sundowners in the park, Christmas in July and other community gatherings.

Newport has a two yacht clubs (Newport Cruising Yacht Club and Moreton Bay Boat Club) which regularly sail and compete each Wednesday (WAGS) and Saturday (SAGS).

Newport is also a base for the Newport Game Fishing Club which competes both in Moreton Bay and off-shore.

There are a number of parks in the area:

 Ashmole Road Park
 Atlanta Court Park

 Boardman Road Park

 Cooper Park

 Hubner Park

 Jim Findlay Park

 Madeleine Court Park

 Morgan Park

 Newport Park

 Southern Cross Park

 Talobilla Park

See also
Redcliffe Peninsula road network

References

External links

 

Suburbs of Moreton Bay Region